Rafael Cruz López was a Puerto Rican pitcher in the Negro leagues in the 1910s.

A native of Puerto Rico, Cruz played for the Cuban Stars (East) in 1918. In three recorded appearances on the mound, he posted a 5.06 ERA over 10.2 innings.

References

External links
Baseball statistics and player information from Baseball-Reference Black Baseball Stats and Seamheads

Year of birth missing
Year of death missing
Place of birth missing
Place of death missing
Cuban Stars (East) players